Empogona concolor is a species of plant in the family Rubiaceae. It is endemic to Gabon.

References

Sources

Flora of Gabon
Empogona
Vulnerable plants
Endemic flora of Gabon
Taxonomy articles created by Polbot